The simple station Pepe Sierra is part of the TransMilenio mass-transit system of Bogotá, Colombia, which opened in the year 2000.

Location

The station is located in northern Bogotá, specifically on Autopista Norte with Calle 115.

It serves the Alhambra, Malibú and San Patricio neighborhoods, as well as the commercial and financial area of Calle 116.

History

After the opening of the Portal de Usme in early 2001, the Autopista Norte line was opened. This station was added as a northerly expansion of that line, which was completed with the opening of the Portal del Norte later that year.

The station is named Pepe Sierra due to its proximity to Calle 116, known as Avenida Pepe Sierra.

End June 2003, an explosive went off on a bus arriving at this station. 70 passengers were able to get off before the articulated bus burned.

Station services

Old trunk services

Main line service

Feeder routes

This station does not have connections to feeder routes.

Inter-city service

This station does not have inter-city service.

See also
Bogotá
TransMilenio
List of TransMilenio Stations

External links
TransMilenio

TransMilenio